The Japan national rugby union team, often known as the Cherry Blossoms, Sakura, and more recently The Brave Blossoms (ブレイブ・ブロッサムズ - Bureibu burossamuzu) is traditionally the strongest rugby union power in Asia and has enjoyed and endured mixed results against non-Asian teams over the years. Rugby union in Japan is administered by the Japan Rugby Football Union (JRFU), which was founded in 1926. They compete annually in the Pacific Nations Cup and previously in the Asia Rugby Championship. They have also participated in every Rugby World Cup since the tournament began in 1987.

Rugby was first played in Japan's treaty ports as early as 1866. Popular participation by local university teams was established in 1899 and Japan's first recorded international match was a match against a Canadian team in 1932. Notable games for Japan include a victory over the Junior All Blacks in 1968, and a narrow 6–3 loss to England in 1971. Famous wins by Japan include a 28–24 victory over a Scotland XV in 1989 and a 23–8 victory over Wales in 2013. In 2011, Japan displayed its progress by winning the 2011 IRB Pacific Nations Cup, played against Fiji, Samoa and Tonga. Further progress was displayed in 2014 when Japan completed a string of ten consecutive test wins (a record for a tier 2 team) to rank in the world's top 10 teams. This continued into 2015 where they produced the first of their three biggest upsets when, in a Rugby World Cup pool match against South Africa, they won 34–32.

In the years between, Japan faced quality opposition, playing relatively well with solid results including a tie against France, and a narrow loss to Wales at Cardiff. Their second shock win was a 19–12 defeat of world number-two ranked Ireland in a 2019 Rugby World Cup pool game. Emerging undefeated from the tournament's pool stage after a 28–21 victory over Scotland, Japan made their first-ever World Cup quarter-final appearance, going down 3–26 to eventual world champions South Africa.

History

The first recorded instance of a team being established and rugby being played in Japan was in 1866 with the founding of the Yokohama Foot Ball Club. Games, mainly between service personnel, were played on the Garrison Parade Ground in Yamate, Yokohama. In 1874 records also illustrate British sailors staging a game in Yokohama. Other games were played at other treaty ports such as Kobe between teams of long-term foreign residents and visiting ships' crews and garrisons, but they rarely involved Japanese players. The date of local Japanese participation in the sport is most frequently cited as 1899, when students at Keio University were introduced to the game by Professor Edward Bramwell Clarke and Ginnosuke Tanaka both graduates of Cambridge University.

The formation of a national team and effectively Japan's first international match took place in Osaka on 31 January 1932 when a trade delegation from Canada to Japan supported an overseas tour by the Canada national rugby union team. The Japanese won this first match 9–8. In a second test match in Tokyo 11 days later again the Japanese side beat the Canadians 38–5.

Japan beat the Junior All Blacks 23–19 in 1968 after losing the first four matches on a tour of New Zealand, but they won the last five. The Japanese (coached by Waseda University Professor Onishi Tetsunosuke) lost by just 3–6 to England in Tokyo on 29 September 1971 in the RFU's centenary year. The 1973 Japan rugby union tour of Wales, England and France was less successful with the side winning only two of their eleven matches, and losing the international matches against Wales and France. Ten years later Japan gave Wales a fright in losing by a slim five-point margin, 24–29, at Cardiff Arms Park on 2 October 1983.

On 28 May 1989, a strong Japan coached by Hiroaki Shukuzawa defeated an uncapped Scotland, missing nine British Lions on tour in Australia, for the first time at Chichibunomiya Rugby Stadium, 28–24. The Japan team included such Kobe Steel stalwarts as centre Seiji Hirao (captain), and locks Atsushi Oyagi and Toshiyuki Hayashi (38 Japan caps and a member of Oxford University's all-time best XV). Sinali Latu at No. 8 was then a fourth year student at Daito Bunka University, and speedy Yoshihito Yoshida on the wing (no. 14) was a third year at Meiji University. Scotland missed an incredible seven penalties and refused the kicking tee which was generously offered – as a surviving video of the game shows. It was almost the same Japanese team which defeated Zimbabwe in RWC1991.

Under Shogo Mukai (2001–2003)
After Hirao resigned, Toshiba Brave Lupus coach Shogo Mukai was appointed in March 2001 to lead Japan up to the 2003 Rugby World Cup. Mukai left his post after the tournament to spend more time with his family.

Under Mitsutake Hagimoto (2004–2005)
After Shogo Mukai left after the 2003 Rugby World Cup, the JRFU initially tried to appoint Eddie Jones from his post with  but were unsuccessful and instead appointed Mitsutake Hagimoto in March 2004 after he won the inaugural Top League with the Kobelco Steelers. Under Hagimoto, Japan decided they would not select foreign born players after Mukai had been criticised for playing too many at the World Cup.

Japan's performances were described as "pathetic", and the squad was called "a joke" with some key players ignored or not given permission to travel.

Under Jean-Pierre Élissalde (2005–2006)

After Hagimoto left his post at the end of June 2005, Jean-Pierre Élissalde who had been appointed backs coach three months earlier took full charge and became the first foreigner to be the head coach for Japan.

In 2006, despite a disappointing campaign in the inaugural Pacific Nations Cup in June where Japan lost all their matches, and also lost to heavily to  52–6, Élissalde was backed to lead the side to the 2007 Rugby World Cup. But Élissalde was later sacked in September after he took on a job with Bayonne without consulting the JRFU and then refused to give up his job with them. Assistant coach Osamu Ota took over as caretaker coach for two Rugby World Cup qualifiers in November 2006.

Under John Kirwan (2007–2011)

John Kirwan was appointed head coach on in October 2006 after Elissalde was sacked. He initially worked as an advisor to caretaker coach Osamu Ota before taking over the job completely in 2007.

After starting with large wins over the Asian opposition, Japan only won one of their remaining 10 fixtures in 2007, although in the 2007 Rugby World Cup they did gain a draw with a last minute touchline conversion from Shotaro Onishi against Canada to end a long losing streak of World Cup matches stretching back to 1991.

However, despite more positive results in between World Cups, Japan had a disappointing 2011 Rugby World Cup, losing 31–18 to  who they had beaten four times in a row since 2008, and drawing again to  who they had beaten 46–8 and 27–6 in 2009, and Japan left the World Cup winless meaning they still had not won a match at the tournament since 1991. Kirwan came under pressure after the tournament and he resigned from his post after his contract came to the end at the end of the year.

The tenure of Kirwan as coach was notable for a large number of imports he selected. Players who originated from New Zealand such as James Arlidge, Bryce Robins, Shaun Webb, Ryan Nicholas, Luke Thompson or Tonga such as Alisi Tupuailei and Sione Vatuvei all featured prominently under Kirwan. The large percentage of foreigners in the national team also caused criticism for Kirwan. However, despite failing to bring Japan a World Cup win, Kirwan left his post as the most successful Japan coach of the professional era with a win rate of 58.18% from 55 matches.

Under Eddie Jones (2012–2015)
Kirwan chose not to renew his contract as head coach when it expired at the end of 2011, and the Japan Rugby Football Union announced that former Australia coach Eddie Jones would be his successor. Jones stated that his intention was to take the Japanese national team into the top 10 on the international rankings, and that they must develop a style of play to allow them to win games against teams such as Scotland.

Jones made his debut as Japan head coach against Kazakhstan. He had selected a total of 10 uncapped players out of the 22 selected players. They went on to win the match 87–0. They then had a big win over United Arab Emirates where young 18-year-old Yoshikazu Fujita set a new Asian Five Nations record for the most tries in a single match with a total of 6. This was also Fujita's international debut.

In 2013, Jones led Japan to their sixth consecutive championship win in the Asian Five Nations, where Japan achieved a tournament record score of 121–0 against the Philippines. In May, the nation lost their opening match of the 2013 IRB Pacific Nations Cup to Tonga, followed by a defeat to Fiji in the second round. Following these matches, Japan faced a 2-test series against Wales. Japan lost narrowly, 18–22, in the first test, but won the second test 23–8, and the series ended in a 1–1 draw. This was the first time that Japan had recorded a victory over the Welsh.

On 16 October 2013, Jones was hospitalised after having a suspected stroke and was released from hospital 2 days later on 18 October 2013. After his release from hospital, it was announced that Jones would miss Japan's 2013 end-of-year rugby union tests against New Zealand, Scotland, Gloucester, Russia and Spain, and former Australia skills coach and current technical adviser for Japan Scott Wisemantel would interim coach Japan for their 2013 end-of-year rugby union tests.

On 19 September 2015, Japan stunned South Africa by a last minute try from Karne Hesketh to win 34–32 in their opening group pool game at the 2015 Rugby World Cup in Brighton, England. BBC reported the win as "arguably the biggest upset in rugby union history". In 2015, Japan became the first team in World Cup history to win three pool games but still be eliminated at the group stage, due to their heavy loss to Scotland.

Under Jamie Joseph (2016–present)
Jamie Joseph, former coach of New Zealand's Highlanders Super Rugby team and the Māori All Blacks, took over as head coach for Japan (and the Sunwolves Super Rugby team) in 2016. In the 2017 Asia Rugby Championship, Japan sealed their twelfth consecutive Asia Rugby Championship, winning all four games. They went on to defeat Romania 33–21 in the 2017 June rugby union tests, but lost to Ireland 2–0, during their first test series since 2005, losing the first test 50–22 and the second 35–13. In November 2017, Joseph led his side to a single win and a draw in four games. They started their End-of-year series with two consecutive home losses, a 27–47 loss to a World XV side and a 30–63 loss to Australia. Japan's first win came against Tonga 39–6 in Toulouse, France, before going on to draw with France 23–23, which was the first time that these two nations had drawn with one another.

During the 2018 June tests, Joseph led Japan to a 1–all series draw with Italy, winning the first test 34–17, and losing the second 25–22. The team then beat Georgia 28–0 at the Toyota Stadium.

In 2019, Japan won the Pacific Nations Cup with wins against Fiji, Tonga and the United States, with no losses.

Japan hosted the Rugby World Cup in 2019, and the team repeated their feat of a shock win in Brighton at the 2015 World Cup, this time beating world No. 2-ranked Ireland 19–12 at Shizuoka Stadium in Fukuroi, Shizuoka They reached the quarter-finals for the first time in the team's history after beating Scotland 28–21 at the International Stadium Yokohama in Yokohama that was battered by Typhoon Hagibis only the night before.

Kits
Japan traditionally plays with white and red hooped shirts (with white collar and cuffs) with a Sakura embroidered on the chest, paired with white shorts and white socks with red splashes. Between 2003 and 2011, the shirt was predominantly red with two white parallel hoops on the chest with white accents, sometimes with black or navy socks and shorts.

Since its first test against Canada in 1930, Japan played with the traditional hooped red and white shirts, the emblem on the shirt originally depicted the Sakura as "bud, half-open and full-bloomed". The current version of the emblem, depicting three full-bloomed Sakura, was dated 1952, when Japan played against Oxford University XV at Hanazono, Higashi-Osaka, on 1 October 1952.

On 4 July 2019 the Japan Rugby Football Union on Thursday unveiled the national team's jersey for this year's Rugby World Cup, the shirt featuring a samurai helmet motif representing the tradition of Japan's warrior spirit. The combination of Samurai and Sakura (Cherry Blossom) has long been linked in Japanese culture.

The away kit usually consist of a navy blue uniform, white or navy shorts and navy blue socks, sometimes with white collar or panels, or black.
The kit supplier since the 1997 is Canterbury. Before that,, the kits were manufactured by Japanese company Sceptre between 1987 and 1995 and in 1982, by Suzuki Sports.
Currently, the jersey sponsors are Lipovitan D (in the front) and Toshiba (in the back). Previously, between 1997 and 2001, the shirt sponsor was Japan Telecom.

Home kit

Away kit

List of matches

Wins against Tier 1 nations

Additionally, Japan tied  23–23 in Paris, 25 November 2017.
Official Japan Schedules
Official Japan Results

Overall

Below is table of the representative rugby matches played by a Japan national XV to 30 October 2022.

Coaches

 Shigeru Kayama (1930–1934)
 Chuji Kitajima (1936, 1956)
 Takenosuke Okumura (1952–1953)
 Kozo Nishino (1958)
 Tomoo Chiba (1959)
 Masao Wada (1959)
 Yasujiro Kasai (1963)
 Tetsunosuke Onishi (1966–1971)
 Hitoshi Oka (1972, 1975, 1985–1986)
 Hisashi Yokoi (1972, 1976, 1978–1979)
 Ryo Saito (1974, 1976–1978, 1980–1981)
 Hiroshi Hibino (1976, 1982–1984, 1987–1988)
 Katsumi Miyaji (1978, 1984, 1987)
 Ryozo Imazato (1979)
 Iwao Yamamoto (1980, 1982, 1996)
 Hiroaki Shukuzawa (1989–1991)
 Osamu Koyabu (1992–1995)
 Seiji Hirao (1997–2000)
 Shogo Mukai (2001–2003)
 Mitsutake Hagimoto (2004–2005)
 Jean-Pierre Élissalde (2005–2006)
 Osamu Ota (2006) (Caretaker)
 John Kirwan (2007–2011)
 Eddie Jones (2012–2015)
 Scott Wisemantel (2013) (Caretaker)
 Ryuji Nakatake (April–May 2016) (Interim)
 Mark Hammett (June 2016) (Interim)
  Jamie Joseph (2016–present)

Current squad
On 23 September, Jamie Joseph announced a 41-man wider squad that will form part of the squad for Japan XVs 3-match series against Australia A and prepare for the test match against New Zealand on 29 October. The squad will be decreased for their 2-match European Tour playing against 
England and France.

On 2 October, Kota Kaishi was called up the squad to broaden depth in the hooker position.

On 3 October, Daichi Akiyama was called up to the squad.

Head Coach:  Jamie Joseph

Caps updated: 26 October 2022

Notable former players

Yoshihiro Sakata, 16 caps, member of World Rugby Hall of Fame
Toshiyuki Hayashi, legendary lock with Kobe Steel, Oxford and Japan.
Seiji Hirao, centre, former Japan captain and coach of Japan (RWC1999).
Keiji Hirose, former fly-half, and previously the leading points scorer for Japan (now second).
Kensuke Iwabuchi, the first Japanese to play professional rugby in England (for Saracens), also technical adviser to Sanix.
Toru Kurihara, world record points scorer in one match, 60 points scored individually (6 Tries, 15 conversions).
Sinali Latu, now coach of Daito Bunka University RFC.
Yuji Matsuo, fly-half (stand-off), Shin-Nittetsu Kamaishi.
Andrew Miller, fly-half for Kobe Steel and Japan.
Takuro Miuchi, former number 8 and captain at the 2007 Rugby World Cup.
Wataru Murata, player of Yamaha Jubilo.
Daisuke Ohata, world record try scorer (69 tries throughout his career) member of World Rugby Hall of Fame
Atsushi Oyagi, lock, Kobe Steel and Japan, now a TV personality ("talento").
Kenzo Suzuki, better known as a professional wrestler, Suzuki was capped for the national team.
Yoshihito Yoshida, world class Japanese wing, known especially on the Sevens circuit.
Ayumu Goromaru, former fullback and the leading points scorer for Japan.
Kenki Fukuoka, former wing of Japan, known for his speed and sidesteps.

Player records (career)

Most matches

Most tries

Most points

Most matches as captain

Player records (match)

Most points in a match

Most tries in a match

Tournament history

Rugby World Cup

Japan has participated in the Rugby World Cup since the tournament's inception in 1987, and has made appearances in all tournaments thus far. Despite this, they experienced little success until the 2015 tournament, with just one victory over Zimbabwe in 1991, and two draws with Canada in 2007 and 2011. In 2015 they defeated South Africa with a score of 34–32, their first win since 1991 against Zimbabwe, which they followed up with victories over Samoa and the United States in the same pool stage, but despite their 3–1 record failed to reach the knockout round.

They were the home team for the 2019 Rugby World Cup, which was held in Japan.

In the 2019 World Cup, Japan were drawn in Group A alongside Ireland, Russia, Samoa, and Scotland. After a nervy opening night win against Russia (30–10), Japan went on to beat Ireland 19–12, a huge upset and a result few predicted. Their third group game against Samoa ended in another win, this time 38–19, while also securing a highly important bonus point (for scoring four or more tries).

In the highly anticipated final group game against Scotland, both teams needed to win to progress to the knockout stages at the expense of the other. The match went ahead despite pre-game worries that it would have to be cancelled due to the ongoing issues caused by Typhoon Hagibis. The pre-tournament rules stated that if the typhoon was sufficient enough to intervene, the game would be cancelled, and the result declared a draw. This controversial rule would have allowed Japan to progress by default due to previous results.

After final safety checks, the game was allowed to commence. Japan edged out Scotland 28–21 to register their second shock win of the tournament. They also became the first Asian nation to top their group at a Rugby World Cup, and the first Asian team to progress to the knockout stages.

Japan played South Africa in the quarter-finals in Tokyo on Sunday 20 October 2019, kick off 19:15 JST. They kept pace with South Africa in the first half, but two tries and three penalties in the second half for South Africa put the game out of reach and Japan lost 26–3.

Pacific Nations Cup

2006: 5th
2007: 6th
2008: 5th
2009: 4th
2010: 3rd
2011: 1st
2012: 4th
2013: 4th
2014: 1st
2015: 4th
2019: 1st

Asia Rugby Championship

See also

Rugby union in Japan
List of Japan national rugby union test matches
Japan women's national rugby union team

References

External links
Japan national rugby union team – official website 
41st University Rugby Championship
Japanese rugby union news from Planet Rugby 

 
 
1932 establishments in Japan
Rugby clubs established in 1932